Kathrin Piotrowski is a retired German badminton player. At the age of 16, she was one of the youngest Bundesliga players ever. She has won five German championship titles and five international titles on her account. She also has three German team championships to her name and 2 medals at the European Men's and Women's team Championships & Uber Cup. She has also played for her country in World Championships.

Achievements

IBF World Grand Prix 
The World Badminton Grand Prix sanctioned by International Badminton Federation (IBF) since 1983 to 2006.

Men's doubles

Mixed doubles

IBF/BWF International 
Women's doubles

Mixed doubles

 BWF International Challenge tournament
 BWF International Series tournament

References 

1980 births
Living people
German female badminton players